The Cape Meares Light is an inactive lighthouse on the coast of Oregon. It is located on Cape Meares just south of Tillamook Bay. It is open to the public.

History
Built in 1890, Cape Meares Light served as the light station for Tillamook Bay. When it was built, the lighthouse complex included two keeper's houses, two oil houses, and two cisterns, and was connected to the light by a  boardwalk. Later additions included an attached workroom in 1895 and a garage in 1934. The light itself was iron-plated, and due to its exposure to the elements, it required frequent repainting over the years. No foghorn was ever installed at Cape Meares. In 1934, the light received electricity. Now unnecessary, the oil houses were removed.

In 1963, the lighthouse was deactivated and replaced by a newer tower. The following year, the Coast Guard made plans to demolish the light. However, due to public outcry, the plans fell through, and the Coast Guard turned the station over to Tillamook County. The light remained vacant until 1968, when the site was turned over to the Oregon State Parks Department. During this time, vandalism became a major problem for the light. Eventually, the vandalism took its toll on the keeper's quarters and they were subsequently demolished. Among the damage, four of the bulls-eyes in the Fresnel lens were stolen. That same year, the light was opened up to the public and the light was restored, with the exception of the missing bulls-eyes. Since then, three of the four missing bulls-eyes have been recovered. The bull's-eye of Cape Meares Light produced light visible for 21 miles. Four sides of the 8-sided lens were covered with red glass, which produced an alternating red and white beam as the light turned.  In 1980, the tower itself was opened to the public.

The structure was listed on the National Register of Historic Places in 1993.

The U.S. Coast Guard permanently switched off Cape Meares Light (LLNR 675) on Wednesday, June 25, 2014, as it is no longer considered necessary for safe navigation of the seacoast.

2010 vandalism

Between the afternoon of January 9 and noon on January 10, 2010, an unknown vehicle reportedly drove down a blocked maintenance road to the lighthouse viewing area. A number of rounds were fired, breaking 15 of the lighthouse's windows and several parts of the historic Fresnel lens. Additional rounds were fired into a (no longer active) Coast Guard light and surrounding equipment. While driving off the maintenance road the suspect vehicle also caused significant damage to a grassy area. Damages were initially estimated to be over $50,000, but subsequent inspections have shown it may cost more than $500,000 to repair the lens. A park ranger stated that the lens was created in Paris in 1888 and had been shipped around the tip of South America to Oregon. Early news reports stated a $1,000 reward was being offered for information leading to arrests, a figure which was raised to $3,000 by the evening of January 11. On February 10, two Oceanside men, Zachary Jon Pyle, age 23 and David Regin Wilks Jr. age 26, were arrested in connection with the vandalism. At the time of the arrests the reward had climbed to $6,000. The men were convicted and received a creative sentence by a Tillamook County District Court judge. Wilkes and Pyle were ordered to pay $100,000 to the lighthouse and serve three 16-day jail terms over three years. Each jail term started on December 27, which coincides with the date of the vandalism. They served their first sentence from December 27, 2010, to January 11, 2011, and they would do so again at the end of the next two years.

The men, who admitted they were drunk at the time, said it was the dumbest thing they had ever done. In handing down the sentence, the judge said, "Some people go to Hawaii for vacation and some people go to jail. The next three years will serve as a reminder, and you are going to get some time to contemplate that." as quoted in a news story at Lighthouse Digest.

See also
List of lighthouses on the Oregon Coast
National Register of Historic Places listings in Tillamook County, Oregon

References

External links

 Cape Meares website

Lighthouses completed in 1890
Oregon Coast
Lighthouses on the National Register of Historic Places in Oregon
Transportation buildings and structures in Tillamook County, Oregon
National Register of Historic Places in Tillamook County, Oregon
1890 establishments in Oregon